Sri Sairam College of Engineering,  formerly known as Shirdi Sai Engineering College, is an engineering institution located in Bangalore, Karnataka, India. This Institution is affiliated to Visvesvaraya Technological University, Belagavi .

Certification
Accredited by NAAC with B++ Grade
Accredited by Institutions of Engineers (India)
Rated 5 start in Institution Innovation Council by MoE
ISO 9001:2015 Certification

Ratings & Rankings

Sri Sairam College of Engineering was ranked  among engineering colleges in India by the National Institutional Ranking Framework in 2021. Outlook ranked it  among private engineering colleges in 2021.

Campus locality
The college is located in Anekal, Bengaluru Urban District – Pin: 562106

Infrastructure
Central and Departmental Libraries
National and International journals
Supplementary digital resources (CD-ROMs and audio cassettes)
E- Journals Access Like IEEE, Springer 
Digital Library Access
Computer labs
 WiFi Zone
 English Communication Lab
Auditorium
Auditorium
Audio Visual Room
Open Air Auditorium
Outdoor Sports facilities
Athletic track
Cricket pitch
Volleyball courts
Football fields
Dining Halls
Special Dining Hall
Eat-outs
Transportation
Fleet of 12 buses plying most of the routes in Bengaluru city & Hosur

Courses offered

Sri Sairam College of Engineering affiliated to VTU currently offers Undergraduate degrees in engineering in the following specializations.
 B.E. Electrical & Electronics Engineering 
 B.E. Electronics and Communication Engineering
 B.E. Computer Science and Engineering
 B.E. Mechanical Engineering
B.E. Artificial Engineering & Machine Learning

About College

Sri Sairam College of Engineering (formerly Shirdi Sai Engineering College), Bengaluru had a humble beginning in the year 1997 in its temporary campus at Magadi Road. Today the Sairam has successfully completed 23 years of its service in the field of Technical Education.

External links 

Sri Sairam College of Engineering

References

Affiliates of Visvesvaraya Technological University
All India Council for Technical Education
Engineering universities and colleges in India
Educational institutions established in 1997
1997 establishments in Karnataka